Quản Bạ is a rural district of Ha Giang province in the Northeast region of Vietnam. As of 2019, the district had a population of 53 476. The district covers an area of 550 km2. The district capital lies at Tam Sơn.

Administrative divisions
Quản Bạ District consists of the district capital, Tam Sơn, and 12 communes: Bát Đại Sơn, Cán Tỷ, Cao Mã Pờ, Đông Hà, Lùng Tám, Nghĩa Thuận, Quản Bạ, Quyết Tiến, Tả Ván, Thái An, Thanh Vân and Tùng Vài.

References

Districts of Hà Giang province
Hà Giang province